Hannes Delcroix (born 28 February 1999) is a professional footballer who plays as a centre-back for Belgian First Division A club Anderlecht. Born in Haiti, he represents the Belgium national team.

Club career
Delcroix was born in Petite Rivière de l'Artibonite, Haiti, and at a young age moved to Kalmthout, in Belgium. Delcroix joined the youth academy of Anderlecht in 2013. Delcroix signed his first professional contract with Anderlecht on 25 January 2017. He made his professional debut with Anderlecht in a 5–2 Belgian First Division A win over Oostende on 5 August 2018.

In July 2019, Delcroix was sent on a one-season loan to Eredivisie club RKC Waalwijk, who had just won promotion. On 3 August, Delcroix made his debut as a starter in the away match against VVV-Venlo, scoring the opener in the eleventh minute of play. His team eventually lost the game 3–1. Delcroix remained a starter throughout the season under head coach Fred Grim. After made a total of 24 competitive appearances, all as a starter, his loan spell ended and Delcroix returned to Anderlecht. Despite interest from RKC to extend the loan deal, Delcroix opted for a return to Anderlecht.

International career
Born in Haiti, Delcroix was raised in Belgium. He is a youth international for Belgium, and captained various of their youth teams. He was called up to the senior Belgium squad in November 2020 and made his first appearance on 11 November against Switzerland.

Career statistics

References

External links
 
 Soccerway Profile
 
 RSCA Profile

1999 births
Living people
People from Artibonite (department)
Belgian footballers
Belgium youth international footballers
Belgium under-21 international footballers
Belgium international footballers
Haitian footballers
Belgian people of Haitian descent
Haitian emigrants to Belgium
R.S.C. Anderlecht players
RKC Waalwijk players
Belgian Pro League players
Eredivisie players
Belgian expatriate footballers
Expatriate footballers in the Netherlands
Association football defenders